Dark Night of the Scarecrow is a 1981 American made-for-television horror film directed by veteran novelist Frank De Felitta (author of Audrey Rose) from a script by J.D. Feigelson. Feigelson's intent had been to make an independent feature, but his script was bought by CBS for television; despite this, only minor changes were made to the original screenplay.

Plot
In a small town in the Deep South, Charles Eliot "Bubba" Ritter, a large but gentle mentally challenged man, befriends young Marylee Williams. Some of the townspeople are upset by the closeness between Marylee and Bubba, and the brooding, mean-spirited postman Otis Hazelrigg is the worst. When Marylee is mauled by a vicious dog and lies unconscious at a doctor's office, Otis promptly assumes that Bubba has murdered her even though Bubba saved her life. Otis and three friends – gas station attendant Skeeter Norris and farmer-cousins Philby and Harliss Hocker – form a lynch mob. Bubba's mother disguises him as a scarecrow and posts him in a nearby field to wait for the drama to cease. The bloodhounds sniff Bubba out, and all four vigilantes fire multiple rounds from their guns, killing him. Afterwards, they discover that Marylee is in fact alive, thanks to Bubba, whom they have just murdered. Acting fast, Otis places a pitchfork in Bubba's lifeless hands to make it appear as if he were attacking them with a weapon. The vigilantes are subsequently released because of lack of evidence against them (and blatant perjury by Otis) when the murder is brought to court.

Marylee, who has recovered from the attack, sneaks out of her room at night and goes over to the Ritter house looking for Bubba. Mrs. Ritter cannot bring herself to tell Marylee the truth and instead tells her that Bubba has gone away where no one can hurt him. Marylee runs out of the house to look for Bubba and Mrs. Ritter goes after her. She finds Marylee sitting under the stake where Bubba had been killed, singing a favorite song of hers and Bubba's and then she calmly tells Mrs. Ritter that Bubba is not gone, only hiding. Moved by the little girl's words, Mrs. Ritter seems to regain some peace.

A day later, Harliss finds a scarecrow in his fields like the one Bubba was hidden in; there is no indication of who put it there. Otis suspects the district attorney of putting it there to rattle the four of them and tells the others to keep calm and do nothing. In the evening, the figure disappears, and Harliss hears activity in his barn. He is investigating up in the loft when a wood chipper below starts of its own accord. Startled, he topples over into the machine and is killed. Since the wood chipper had not run out of gasoline after Harliss had been killed but had been switched off, Otis, Philby and Skeeter suspect that Harliss' death was not accidental. Otis goes to Mrs. Ritter's and obliquely accuses her of having engineered this supposed accident; she denies involvement, but says that other agencies will punish her son's murderers. She also implies that Otis is a pedophile because of his intense interest in Marylee, which causes him to run off.

At the local church's Halloween party while playing hide-and-seek with the other children, Marylee is confronted by Otis, who tries to get her to tell him that Mrs. Ritter is behind the recent events. Instead, she tells him that she knows what he and his friends did to Bubba and runs from him. Otis chases after her but is stopped by a security guard, who tells him to go back to the party.

The scarecrow soon reappears in Philby's field, and that night Otis breaks into Mrs. Ritter's house. Trying to stop what he sees as the next stage of her plot, he shocks her so badly with his sudden appearance in her home that she suffers a fatal heart attack. To cover his tracks, Otis starts a gas leak which results in an explosion that destroys the house. While everyone else believes the explosion was an accident, the district attorney is suspicious.

The next night, Philby is disturbed by a commotion in his hog pen; while checking it out, mysterious occurrences make him panic and try to flee in his car, which refuses to start. He is pursued across his property and takes refuge in a grain silo, shutting the door behind him. A conveyor belt feeding into the building is switched on. Philby, unable to open the now-locked door of the silo, is buried in the resulting avalanche of grain and suffocates.

The next day, upon learning from Otis of Philby's death, Skeeter is ready to turn himself in rather than face any portended wrath. Otis remains convinced that recent occurrences are a hoax arranged to avenge Bubba's murder and that Bubba himself is still alive. That night he and Skeeter dig up Bubba's grave, ostensibly to prove that the corpse is not there. Skeeter opens the coffin to reveal that the corpse is, in fact, still there and, in panic, tries to flee. Otis chases after and stops him, promising to go along with whatever Skeeter decides to do. They return to the grave to refill it, but while Skeeter is down in the grave closing the coffin lid, Otis decides then to protect himself, kills Skeeter by smashing his skull with a shovel, and fills in the grave with Skeeter inside it.

Driving home in an intoxicated state, Otis sees Marylee alone in the middle of the road. Pursuing her, he crashes his van and chases her on foot into a pumpkin patch. Catching up with her, he accuses her of masterminding the scarecrow murders when a plowing machine nearby starts up of its own accord. Terrified, Otis flees as the machine pursues him. Running through the field, Otis runs into the scarecrow which is holding the pitchfork that was planted on Bubba's corpse, and is impaled on the tines.  Mortally wounded, Otis collapses and dies. Marylee, who has been hiding in the pumpkin patch, hears footsteps approaching; she looks up to see the scarecrow looking down at her and smiles. It bends down, presenting her with a flower, and she says "Thank you, Bubba." Marylee then innocently tells him that she has a new game to teach him, called "the chasing game".

Cast
Larry Drake as Charles Elliot "Bubba" Ritter
Charles Durning as Otis P. Hazelrigg
Robert F. Lyons as Skeeter Norris
Claude Earl Jones as Philby
Lane Smith as Harliss Hocker
Tonya Crowe as Marylee Williams
Jocelyn Brando as Mrs. Ritter
Tom Taylor as D.A. Sam Willock
Richard McKenzie as Judge Henry
Ivy Jones as Mrs. Willams
James Tartan as Frank Williams (as Jim Tartan)
Ed Call as Defense Attorney
Alice Nunn as Mrs. Bunch
John Steadman as Mr. Loomis
Ivy Bethune as Mrs. Hocker
Dennis Robertson as Ray
Jetta Scelza as Mrs. Whimberly

Release
Dark Night of the Scarecrow premiered on CBS on October 24, 1981. It was later screened on 29 April 2010 as part of the Texas Frightmare Weekend.

Home video
The film was released on VHS by Key Video in the mid-1980s.

The film was later released on DVD by VCI Entertainment on September 28, 2010. VCI Video would later release the film for the first time on Blu-ray on October 11, 2011. VCI would re-release the film on DVD one last time on September 11, 2012.

Reception

Dread Central gave the film a score of 4.5 out of 5, calling it "a spooky masterpiece"; praising the film's atmosphere, characters, and subtlety. Justin Kerswell from Hysteria Lives! awarded the film 4/5 stars, calling it "a slow burning, fantastically creepy small screen tale". In his review, Kerswell praised the film's ambiguity, writing, "At times it's so understated, so well constructed, we are as unsure as the characters as to whether there really is something out there lurking in the dark or, perhaps, their growing paranoia has finally got the better of them." Angel Van Croft from HorrorNews.net gave the film a positive review, calling it "a well made movie with great acting, directing, and plenty of spooky atmosphere."
Cameron McGaughy from DVD Talk offered the film similar praise, writing, "Dark Night of the Scarecrow isn't just one of the best made-for-television films ever made, it's one of the best horror films of all time... Utilizing masterful performances, locations, shots and sounds, it's a simple and subtly scary effort that relies on restraint. It stands the test of time and features an iconic image of evil that has never been more powerful, making this a classic steeped in frightful fall ambience, colors and imagery." Andrew Smith from Popcorn Pictures commended the film's well-rounded characters, cinematography, and "unsettling vibe"; stating that the film was "proof that even TV movies can be effective if the makers are intent on producing something more than standard".

The film was not without its detractors. 
Scott Weinberg from eFilmCritic.com awarded the film 2/5 stars, calling it "laughable junk", and criticized Durning's casting as the main villain.

Legacy

Aaron Crowell, Managing Editor for HorrorHound Magazine, wrote: "With its 1981 release Dark Night of the Scarecrow was the first feature length horror film with a scarecrow as its centerpiece. In the intervening years many have copied this image, but with Dark Night of the Scarecrow writer J. D. Feigelson is credited as creator of the entire 'Killer Scarecrow' horror film subgenre".

References
Notes

Citations

External links
 
 
 
 Dark Night of the Scarecrow: The Terror Trap

1981 films
1981 horror films
1981 television films
1980s slasher films
American supernatural horror films
American supernatural thriller films
American horror thriller films
American slasher films
CBS network films
Fictional scarecrows
Halloween horror films
American horror television films
Backwoods slasher films
Supernatural slasher films
American films about revenge
American ghost films
Films directed by Frank De Felitta
American exploitation films
1980s English-language films
1980s American films